Haliotis brazieri, common name Brazier's ear shell, is a species of sea snail, a marine gastropod mollusk in the family Haliotidae, the abalones.

Description
"The size of the shell varies between 25 mm and 70 mm. The small shell is rounded, oval and flattened. The surface is smooth except for a strong rounded rib revolving midway between the spire and the row of perforations, and fine, hairlike growth striae all over. The 4 to 6 perforations are round, erect and tubular. The color pattern is flesh-colored, red to blood-red, variegated with a few zigzag green markings above, and outside of the row of holes there are numerous short flames extending toward the columella. The shell has about the form of Haliotis pulcherrima, but is flatter, without radiating folds or spiral striae, except for indistinct indications on the spire. A close inspection shows close fine radiating striae all over. The surface between the holes and the columella is strongly convex. The inner surface is silvery pinkish. The columellar plate is not wide, it is flat. The cavity of the spire is red inside."

Distribution
This marine species is endemic to Australia and occurs off New South Wales and Queensland.

References

 Angas, G.F. 1869. Descriptions of twelve new species of land and marine shells from Australia and the Solomon Islands. Proceedings of the Zoological Society of London 1869: 45–49
 Cox, J. 1869. On a new species of Haliotis from New South Wales. Proceedings of the Zoological Society of London 1869: 49.
 Iredale, T. & McMichael, D.F. 1962. A reference list of the marine Mollusca of New South Wales. Memoirs of the Australian Museum 11: 1–109
 Wilson, B. 1993. Australian Marine Shells. Prosobranch Gastropods. Kallaroo, Western Australia : Odyssey Publishing Vol. 1 408 pp. 
 Geiger, D.L. & Poppe, G.T. 2000. A Conchological Iconography. The family Haliotidae. Germany : ConchBooks 135 pp.
 Geiger, D.L. 2000 [1999]. Distribution and biogeography of the recent Haliotidae (Gastropoda: Vetigastropoda) world-wide. Bollettino Malacologico 35(5–12): 57-120
 Geiger D.L. & Owen B. (2012) Abalone: Worldwide Haliotidae. Hackenheim: Conchbooks. viii + 361 pp

External links
 

brazieri
Gastropods described in 1869